Ramzi Saleh (born 8 August 1980) is a Palestinian international footballer. He plays as a goalkeeper, most recently for El Gouna. 

He is the most capped player for Palestine at international level. Saleh had participated in every single FIFA World Cup qualification campaign for Palestine (2002–2014) until injury prevented him for playing against Afghanistan and Thailand in the preliminary rounds of 2014 World Cup qualification.

Early years
Ramzi Saleh was born in Cairo, Egypt to Palestinian father and Egyptian mother, but moved to Jeddah, Saudi Arabia, in 1990. He started to play for local club Al-Ittihad at youth level but eventually returned to the Gaza Strip with his family when his father retired, he signed with Shabab Jabalia in 1999. The following year, he was called up to the national team where he quickly became the undisputed number one, turning in several key saves.

Club career

Move to Al-Ahly
After being awarded a 3-day trial with Egyptian footballing giants Al-Ahly, Shabab Jabalia, in a show of good faith, released him without demanding a transfer fee. After months of playing second fiddle and no official appearances he was awarded the starting job for Al-Ahly after a series of mistakes by incumbent Amir Abdelhamid. He made his first appearance against Ismaily in a 0–1 loss on the 20th Matchday of the 2008/09 season. In the following match, a 2–2 draw with Petrol Asyut, Saleh put in a match of the man performance helping Al-Ahly salvage a point In recognition of his performances, he was awarded Egyptian Premier League Player of the Month for the month of March. The 2008/09 season ended with Ramzi Saleh helping Al-Ahly to another league title after defeating Ismaily 1–0 in a playoff.

After suffering an injury before the 2009–10 season, Ramzi Saleh saw his position go to youngster Ahmed Adel. In the winter transfer window, manager Hossam Al-Badry chose to bring in Sherif Ekramy to fill the post. At the end of the season, Ramzi Saleh elected to leave the club on a bosman.

Al-Merrikh
At the start of the 2009–10 season, Ramzi Saleh picked up an injury and missed all of the preseason with Al-Ahly. As a result, his position was usurped by Al-Ahly youth team player Ahmed Adel Abd El-Moneam. During the winter transfer window, Al-Ahly acquired Sherif Ekramy relegating Ramzi Saleh to third choice goalkeeper. The situation was so bad that Saleh was seen playing as a striker- and scoring- during one training session. After much contemplation, Saleh decided to leave Al-Ahly, it was suspected that he would be included in the transfer that brought Geddo to the Red Castle, but negotiations fell through at the final moment and he was excluded from the deal. While on National Team duty in Sudan Saleh was approached by Al-Merreikh President Gamal Al-Wali to play for the Sudanese side. With no other offers on the table Saleh agreed to sign for the Red Devils in principle. In the following weeks Ramzi received offers to join Alexandria United, Smouha, Zamalek, and Al-Hilal Riyadh but refused these offers stating that he had to stay true to his word. Saleh signed a two-year contract was worth $1 million.  His time with Al-Merreikh was marked by inconsistency and injury. After a three-week layoff, Saleh returned to Al-Merreikh's starting lineup to face Al-Hilal in the decisive encounter of the season. Al-Merrikh would lose the game 3–1 with Saleh being booed by his own fans.

In the off-season, Al-Merreikh brought in Ramzi Saleh's former Al-Ahly manager Hossam Al-Badry with Saleh playing a key role in facilitating the transaction. Despite this, Al-Badry chose to buy Essam El-Hadary from Zamalek for $700,000. Due to his large salary and unwillingness to sit on the bench, Al-Merreikh released Ramzi Saleh from his contract.

Smouha
On 18 December 2010, Zamalek announced a two and a half year deal with the Palestinian goalkeeper.. The deal broke down days later after the two sides failed to agree on a financial compensation package. On 4 January 2010, Ramzi Saleh signed an 18-month contract with Haras El-Hodood. However, days later the deal was broken, also due to financial issues, the player later revealed that his two contracts were terminated due to his former agent sending messages to the two clubs warning them about an injury that Saleh sustained in 1998 that still affects his performance. He later thanked Haras El-Hodood management for being honest with him and Zamalek management for refusing to give away information about his injury so that they will not jeopardize his future.

Ramzi Saleh elected to operate on his ACL in order to clear up any concerns potential clubs may have signing him. The operation was conducted in Germany in February 2011 by the same doctors who had done the same procedure on Ahmad Hassan's knee. As a result of the surgery, Saleh missed the rest of the 2010–11 season as well as 2014 FIFA World Cup qualification matches against Afghanistan and Thailand. On 28 July 2011 it was announced that Saleh had agreed to a 3-year contract with Smouha worth 2 million Egyptian Pounds.

References

External links

 Ramzy Saleh Fans
 Ramzi Saleh at Footballdatabase

1980 births
Living people
Palestinian footballers
Palestine international footballers
Palestinian expatriate footballers
Expatriate footballers in Egypt
Al Ahly SC players
People from Gaza City
Footballers from Cairo
Association football goalkeepers
2015 AFC Asian Cup players
Al-Merrikh SC players
Palestinian expatriate sportspeople in Egypt
Footballers at the 2002 Asian Games
Pyramids FC players
Al Masry SC players
Smouha SC players
El Gouna FC players
Misr Lel Makkasa SC players
Egyptian Premier League players
Asian Games competitors for Palestine